David Pietrusza (born November 22, 1949 in Amsterdam, New York) is an American author and historian.

Career

David Pietrusza has produced a number of critically acclaimed works concerning 20th-century American history, including five volumes ("1920," "1960," "1948," "1932," and "1936: Roosevelt Sweeps Nation") on presidential electoral history. He is also an expert on the 1920s and on the presidency of Calvin Coolidge and the career of Charles Evans Hughes. He has also served as a ghostwriter or "book doctor" for several successful books, including various New York Times and Amazon bestsellers.

As a noted presidential scholar, Pietrusza has been selected to serve on C-SPAN's "Historians Survey on Presidential Leadership" and the Siena College Research Institute (SRI) Survey of United States Presidents and on the C-SPAN/Siena College Study of The First Ladies of The United States. He serves on the National Advisory Board of the Calvin Coolidge Presidential Foundation and previously on the Foundation's Board of Trustees.

Pietrusza holds both bachelor's and master's degrees in history from the University at Albany. He has assisted in teaching seminars at the University of Chicago Institute of Politics (David Axelrod, director) and at the William F. Buckley, Jr. Program at Yale and has served as a guest lecturer at Fordham University, The King's College (New York City), Winthrop University, and Southeast Missouri State University. 

He has spoken at the John F. Kennedy, Harry S. Truman, Franklin D. Roosevelt, and Calvin Coolidge presidential libraries and museums, as well as at various universities, libraries, museums (including the Chicago History Museum, Dallas' Sixth Floor Museum, Palm Beach's Flagler Museum, and Reno's National Automobile Museum), and festivals. He has keynoted the annual birthday ceremonies at the graves of presidents Calvin Coolidge and Chester Alan Arthur and spoken at Wilton, New York's Grant Cottage, scene of the death of President Ulysses S. Grant and via Zoom at Buffalo's Theodore Roosevelt Inaugural National Historic Site.

Pietrusza's book "Rothstein" has been optioned on several occasions for film, television, or stage adaptation. In July 2018, Charles Matthau of the Matthau Organization optioned Pietrusza's "1920: The Year of the Six Presidents" for adaptation into a six-part television series. The project remains in development.

He has served on the City Council in Amsterdam, New York, as Vice-President of the Fulton-Montgomery Community College Foundation, and as Public Information Officer for the New York State Governor's Office of Regulatory Reform and the New York State Office of the Medicaid Inspector General. He chaired the Montgomery County (NY) Charter Revision Commission and served on the City of Amsterdam (NY) Charter Revision Commission and the Schenectady County (NY) Charter Review Committee.

Pietrusza chronicled his early life in the memoir, Too Long Ago: A Childhood Memory. A Vanished World.

Sports publishing
Prior to publishing the wide range of historical and political studies he is best noted for, Pietrusza (a varsity letterman [non-playing] in baseball at Amsterdam. NY's Wilbur H. Lynch High School) distinguished himself in the field of sports (primarily baseball) publishing. He collaborated with baseball legend Ted Williams on an autobiography called  Ted Williams: My Life in Pictures. This book contained pictures of Williams throughout his life (many from his personal collection) and commentary on what each one depicted. Williams died shortly after the book was published. His Judge and Jury: The Life and Times of Judge Kenesaw Mountain Landis  won the CASEY Award as best baseball book of the year.

Pietrusza served as editor-in-chief of the publishing company Total Sports. He was co-editor of Total Baseball: The Official Encyclopedia of Major League Baseball and managing editor of Total Football: The Official Encyclopedia of the National Football League.

Pietrusza's original research has redefined standard opinion on both the role of Commissioner Kenesaw Mountain Landis regarding the game's integration and the role of gambler Arnold Rothstein in the 1919 Black Sox Scandal ("On examination, much of Eight Men Out’s scenario doesn’t make sense. But it is such a well-written book you gloss over the inconsistencies. On even closer examination, many dates, many sequences of events, make even less sense. In fact, they’re impossible.") 

His research and his lobbying with Veterans Committee member Ted Williams has been credited for the 1998 induction of nineteenth century infielder and manager George Davis into the National Baseball Hall of Fame.

He is an Elector of the National Polish-American Sports Hall of Fame. Until its purchase by the New York Mets, Pietrusza was a major shareholder in the International League's Syracuse Chiefs. He served as a commissioner of the Mountain Collegiate League, an independent collegiate league, that included teams in New York and Vermont.

Early baseball re-creations
In the 1990s, Pietrusza participated in recreations of nineteenth-century early baseball contests, including umpiring a game at Ithaca College, commemorating that institution's centennial. On June 6, 1992, along with future Official Major League Baseball Historian John Thorn, he participated in a contest in Troy, New York recreating a contest between the old Troy and Worcester National League teams. Thorn and Pietrusza also participated, along with National Baseball Hall of Fame Librarian Tom Heitz and for former Dodgers and Mets first baseman Tim Harkness in a game in Lake Placid, New York recreating the mid-nineteen century phenomenon of "baseball on ice," in which players bat and field on ice. That game was later featured on ESPN.

Society for American Baseball Research 
From 1993 to 1997, Pietrusza served as president of the Society for American Baseball Research (SABR). During his tenure he instituted the society's donor and merchandising programs, reformed its convention site selection process, and substantially reduced budgeting for board meetings. He held the society's first international board meeting, at Monterrey, Mexico in conjunction with the Mexican Baseball Hall of Fame. His tenure saw the organization publish "The Negro Leagues Book." Aptly described as "a monumental work from the Negro Leagues Committee of the Society for American Baseball Research," it contained extensive research on Negro league rosters, standings, and biographies. He worked to ensure publication (with Turner Publishing) of a ground-breaking history of SABR. His tenure also included the institution of the "Dr. Harold and Dorothy Seymour Medal" for the best baseball history book or biography of the year and presentation of the "SABR Hero of Baseball Award" to Ted Williams and Pee Wee Reese. Following his two terms as SABR president, he served a single term as the organization's secretary.

Broadcast media 

Pietrusza has been interviewed on NPR, MSNBC's "Morning Joe," SIRIUS-XM, The History Channel ("The Ultimate Guide to the Presidents"), the American Heroes Channel ("Mafia's Greatest Hits"), the Voice of America, Newsmax TV, Bloomberg Radio, the Fox News Channel, the John Batchelor Show, the Hugh Hewitt Show, AMC (The Making of the Mob: New York), GBTV, ESPN, the Fox Sports Channel, the MLB Network, The First, and Compound Media. He wrote and produced the PBS-affiliate documentary, "Local Heroes."

He has been interviewed by a range of hosts that includes Joe Scarborough, Mika Brzezinski, Ann Compton, Bill O'Reilly, Glenn Beck, Neal Conan, Neil Cavuto, Tim McCarver, Pat Buchanan, Ray Suarez, Susan Swain, Joe Piscopo, Barry Farber, Joe Franklin, Donna Hanover, Bill Littlefield, and Michael Malice.

He has appeared in the feature film documentary "American Rackets" and will appear in all ten episodes of Ashton Gleckman's upcoming documentary series "Kennedy".

Pietrusza has served as a regular panelist of FoxNews.com Live, appearing with such hosts as Kimberly Guilfoyle, Jonathan Hunt, Harris Faulkner, Julie Banderas, Jamie Colby, and Patti Ann Browne. He has been a frequent guest on C-SPAN and on ESPN documentary series such as SportsCentury, You Can't Blame, and Who's Number 1?.

He has appeared on over a hundred local radio stations including such markets as New York City, Los Angeles, Chicago, Philadelphia, Boston, Washington DC, San Francisco, Detroit, San Diego, St. Louis, Seattle, Dallas, Orlando, Cincinnati, Minneapolis, Las Vegas, and Toronto.

Podcasts 

Pietrusza has appeared on numerous podcasts, including the "Matt Lewis Show Podcast," the United States World War I Centennial Commission weekly podcast, "The History Author Show," "Coffee & Markets," Jonah Goldberg's "The Remnant" podcast; Roifield Brown's London-based "10 American Presidents" (the Franklin Roosevelt and Theodore Roosevelt episodes), "10 American Elections" (the 1964 and 1948 episodes), and "Friday 15" series; Salena Zito's presidential series discussing Calvin Coolidge, Harry S Truman, and Lyndon B. Johnson; the New York State Writer's Institute video podcast, Bill Scher's "New Books in Politics" podcast for the New Books Network; the Halli Casser-Jayne Show, the Gotham Variety Podcast, and Max Sklar's "The Local Maximum," as well as discussing Arnold Rothstein on Erik Rivenes' "More Notorious: A True Crime History Podcast," Noah Brace's "Mobcast," Harry Sultan's "The Wheels Keep Spinning," and discussing his memoir "Too Long Ago" on Avi Woolf's Israeli-based "Conversational Corner."

Awards 
Pietrusza's Roosevelt Sweeps Nation: FDR's 1936 Landslide and the Triumph of the Liberal Ideal received a Kirkus starred review and is nominated for the 2022 Kirkus Prize and the 2022 New Deal Book Award.

Pietrusza's TR's Last War: Theodore Roosevelt, the Great War, and a Journey of Triumph and Tragedy won the 2019 Independent Publisher Book Awards Silver Medal for US History, was Amazon's #1 New Release in World War I Biographies, and was rated the "#1 Top Read of 2018" by the POTUS History Geeks Blog. TR's Last War achieved Finalist status for the Theodore Roosevelt Association Book Prize.

Pietrusza's 1932: The Rise of Hitler and FDR: Two Tales of Politics, Betrayal, and Unlikely Destiny won the 2017 Independent Publisher Book Awards Silver Medal for World History, was nominated for the Kirkus Prize and the American Library Association (ALA)'s "Notable Books List," and received a Kirkus starred review.

Pietrusza's 1948: Harry Truman's Improbable Victory and the Year that Transformed America was named by the Wall Street Journal as among the Five Best Books on "Campaigns and Candidates."

His book 1960: LBJ vs JFK vs Nixon: The Epic Campaign that Forged Three Presidencies was named by ForeWord Magazine as among the best political biographies and received a Library Journal starred review.

Pietrusza's 1920: The Year of the Six Presidents received a Kirkus starred review, was honored as a Kirkus Reviews "Best Books of 2007" title, and was named an alternate selection of the History Book Club. Historian Richard Norton Smith has listed it as being among the best studies of presidential campaigns. The Wall Street Journal ("broad, fluid brush strokes . . . a brisk narrative") rated 1920 as among the Five Best Books on Political Campaigns. Cheatsheet.com ranks 1920 as among the top five "Best Books about Elections."

Pietrusza's biography of Arnold Rothstein entitled Rothstein: The Life, Times & Murder of the Criminal Genius Who Fixed the 1919 World Series  was a finalist for the 2003 Edgar Award. Rothstein'''s audio version won an Audiofile Earphones Award.

Pietrusza's Judge and Jury, his biography of baseball's first commissioner, Kenesaw Mountain Landis, received the 1998 CASEY Award and was also a finalist for the 1998 Seymour Medal and nominated for the NASSH Book Award.

His Lights On!: The Wild Century-Long Saga of Night Baseball was a 1997 CASEY Award finalist.

His Baseball: The Biographical Encyclopedia (co-edited with John Thorn and Michael Gershman) received a Booklist Starred Review.

Pietrusza is the Recipient of the 2011 Excellence in Arts & Letters Award of the Alumni Association of the University at Albany and a member of the initial induction class (2015) of the Greater Amsterdam (NY) School District Hall of Fame. At the NYS Governor's Office of Regulatory Reform, he won the "Director's Award for Exceptional Achievement."

Author Michael Cinquanti's book Fifty Amsterdam NY's Top Ten Lists (2017) lists Pietrusza as among "Amsterdam's All-Time Top Ten Most Famous Residents."

Books

Written or edited by Pietrusza
 Gangsterland: A Tour Through the Dark Heart of Jazz-Age New York City (Diversion Books, November 2023)
 Roosevelt Sweeps Nation: FDR's 1936 Landslide and the Triumph of the Liberal Ideal Too Long Ago: A Childhood Memory. A Vanished World. TR's Last War: Theodore Roosevelt, The Great War, and a Journey of Triumph and Tragedy 
 1932: The Rise of Hitler and FDR: Two Tales of Politics, Betrayal and Unlikely Destiny 
 Calvin Coolidge on The Founders: Reflections on the American Revolution & the Founding Fathers 
 Calvin Coolidge: A Documentary Biography 1948: Harry Truman's Improbable Victory and the Year that Transformed America 
 Sursum Corda: Documents and Readings on the Traditional Latin Mass 
 1960: LBJ vs JFK vs Nixon: The Epic Campaign that Forged Three Presidencies Silent Cal's Almanack: The Homespun Wit and Wisdom of Vermont's Calvin Coolidge 1920: The Year of the Six PresidentsRothstein: The Life, Times and Murder of the Criminal Genius who Fixed the 1919 World SeriesJudge and Jury: The Life and Times of Judge Kenesaw Mountain Landis (Foreword by Richard Thornburgh)Ted Williams: My Life in Pictures (with Ted Williams) (aka Teddy Ballgame)Minor Miracles: The Legend and Lure of Minor League BaseballLights On!: The Wild, Century-Long Saga of Night Baseball (Foreword by Enos Slaughter)Major Leagues: The Formation, Sometimes Absorption and Mostly Inevitable Demise of 18 Professional Baseball Organizations, 1871 to Present (Foreword by Lee MacPhail)Baseball's Canadian American League: A History of Its Inception, Franchises, Participants, Locales, Statistics, Demise & Legacy, 1936-1951 (Foreword by John Thorn)

Co-edited by Pietrusza
 Baseball: The Biographical Encyclopedia Total Baseball: The Official Encyclopedia of Major League Baseball The Total Baseball Catalog: Great Baseball Stuff and How to Buy It The Hidden Game of Football Total Super Bowl Total Quarterbacks Total Steelers Total 49ers Total Packers Total Cowboys Total Mets Total Braves Total IndiansBooks for younger readers

 The End of the Cold War (Lucent, 1994)
 The Invasion of Normandy (Lucent, 1995)
 The Battle of Waterloo (Lucent, 1996)
 John F. Kennedy (Lucent, 1996)
 The Cultural Revolution (Lucent, 1996)
 Smoking (Lucent, 1996)
 The Roaring Twenties (Lucent, 1997)
 The New York Yankees (Enslow, 1997)
 The Phoenix Suns (Enslow, 1997)
 The Boston Celtics (Enslow, 1997)
 The Los Angeles Dodgers (Enslow, 1998)
 Baseball’s Top 10 Managers (Enslow, 1998)
 Michael Jordan (Lucent, 1999)
 The Baltimore Orioles (Lucent, 2000)
 The San Francisco Giants (Enslow, 2000)
 The St. Louis Cardinals (Enslow, 2001)
 The Cleveland Indians'' (Enslow, 2001)

External links
 Official website
 
 Twitter

In Depth interview with Pietrusza, July 1, 2012

1949 births
Living people
21st-century American historians
21st-century American male writers
American political commentators
American political writers
American male non-fiction writers
University at Albany, SUNY alumni
People from Amsterdam, New York
Journalists from New York (state)
Sportswriters from New York (state)
Historians from New York (state)